Sardo is a hard, grating cow's milk Argentine cheese that is similar to Pecorino Romano, although the latter is made from sheep's milk and is sharper. Sardo comes from Argentina, and is not to be confused with Pecorino Sardo, another Italian sheep's cheese. Sardo is traditionally coagulated by animal rennet. Its flavor is mellow, yet rich, and lightly salty. Sardo cheese meets the U.S. Standards of Identity for cow's milk.

See also
List of cheeses

References

Argentine cheeses
Cow's-milk cheeses

pt:Sardo